Shibu Gangadharan is an Indian film director.

Early life 
Gangadharan  was born in a middle-class family in Thiruvananthapuram, Kerala; his father was S. Gangadharan Nair and his mother was S. Chandramathi Amma. He was educated at the Karumom UPS, SMV High School, Thiruvananthapuram, Mahatma Gandhi College and University College Thiruvananthapuram.

Career 
He entered the film field as an assistant director after gaining experience from the amateur drama movement. He started his film career with the National Award-winning film maker Rajeevnath on his film Janani in 1998, and worked with other directors in the industry including Shyamaprasad, K. Madhu, Rajiv Anchal, V.M. Vinu and Sanal Vasudev. He also worked as an assistant/associate director in TV serials, tele-films and documentaries.

Filmography 
As assistant / associate director
Janani (1999)
Priyam (2000)
Sharjah to Sharjah (2001)
Theerthadanam (2001)
Kanmashi (2002)
Moksham (2005)
Iruvattam Manavatti (2005)
Malabar Wedding (2008)
Pakal Nakshatrangal (2008)
Rahasya Police (2009)
T. D. Dasan Std. VI B (2010)
Pattinte Palazhi (2010)
David and Goliath (2013)

As director
Praise The Lord (2014)
Rudra Simhasanam (2015)

References 

1972 births
Living people
Film directors from Thiruvananthapuram
Malayalam film directors